John Raymond Stephens (born 15 September 1950) is a former Australian rules footballer and cricketer during the early 1970s who played for St Kilda in the Victorian Football League (VFL) and also represented Victoria in first-class cricket.

Stephens was a goal kicking rover and after managing eleven majors in a VFA game for Sandringham was picked up by St Kilda.

He played the first six games of the 1971 VFL season before succumbing to a thigh injury which would keep him out of the side for the rest of the year. St Kilda made the Grand Final that year. He was St Kilda Football Clubs leading goalkicker in 1972 and participated in the finals series, but again missed out on playing in the decider when Carlton defeated the Saints in the Preliminary Final, on the back of a seven-goal effort from Alex Jesaulenko.

A consistent performer up forward, only four times in his league career did he fail to kick a goal in a game. He topped St Kilda's goal-kicking in 1972 with 53 goals, including four in their Elimination Final win over Essendon.

As a cricketer, Stephens was a left-handed middle order batsman and appeared in a total of four first-class matches in the 1970–71 and 1971–72 Sheffield Shield seasons. On his debut against Queensland at the MCG, he made his highest score of 48 in the second innings. Stephens finished his career with a disappointing 123 runs at for an average of 15.37. He had played with fellow VFL footballers Peter Bedford, John Scholes and Max Walker.

References

External links

1950 births
Living people
Australian rules footballers from Melbourne
St Kilda Football Club players
Sandringham Football Club players
Australian cricketers
Victoria cricketers
People from East Melbourne
Cricketers from Melbourne